Costanza Trotti Bentivoglio Arconati (June 21, 1800 – May 21, 1871, in Vienna) was an Italian noblewoman and marchioness. She was married into the Visconti family. She is best known for taking part with her husband in the Carbonari revolutions in 1821, and then being exiled in Paris.

References 

1800 births
1871 deaths
Italian nobility